The Ayam Kampong (older spelling) or Ayam Kampung is the chicken breed reported from Indonesia and Malaysia. The name means simply "free-range chicken" or literally "village chicken". In Indonesia, the term ayam kampung refer to indigenous chickens that are raised using traditional free range production techniques by almost every household in the village. It is a diverse population which resulted from the uncontrolled cross-breeding of red jungle-fowl, indigenous Southeast Asian chickens and exotic chickens of various types imported in the late 1800s by European, mainly Dutch and British, settlers.

Characteristics
The Ayam Kampong is a small dual-purpose chicken. They are slow-growing breed that contributed to its low productivity. Both its physical characteristics and its colouring are highly variable. Three principal colour types are recognised. The commonest is the black-red variety, in which cocks are mainly green-black with glossy red-brown back, neck hackles and saddle feathers. Other varieties are the red type and the naked-neck type.

Use

Traditionally Ayam Kampong have been raised by most of the rural population of Indonesia and they represent an important source of meat and eggs. However, due to their low production, Ayam Kampong are not able to provide consumption on a daily basis. Nevertheless, they are traditionally consumed on most family occasions and celebrations.

The poor performance as an egg producer is attributed to the broodiness of the hens.

The meat commands a higher price than that of commercial breeds.

See also
 List of chicken breeds

References

Chicken breeds
Chicken breeds originating in Malaysia
Chicken breeds originating in Indonesia